The Asian Men's Club League Handball Championship (AHF Club League Championship) is the official competition organised by Asian Handball Federation and International Handball Federation for the men's handball clubs of Asia and takes place every year. In addition to crowning the Asian champions, the tournament also serves as a qualifying tournament for the IHF Super Globe.

Summary 

 Played in February 2003.
 Played in June 2008.
 Played in February 2009.
 Played in March 2016.
 Played in March 2019.

Medal table (clubs)

Notes
 Takeover by Lekhwiya SC in 2017 and now the combined new club is known as Al-Duhail SC.
 Known as Lekhwiya SC before 2017.

Medal table (countries)

See also
 Arab Club Handball Championship

External links
 asianhandball.com
 Asian handball Champions League - goalzz.com

Handball competitions in Asia
Multi-national professional sports leagues